The Unicoi Turnpike is a trail in western North Carolina and eastern Tennessee. It was a footpath used by native Americans and was later expanded in the early 19th century for use as a toll road. It once stretched 150 miles and served vehicular traffic. The discover of gold at Coker Creek brought an influx of people and a fort was established to separate miners from Cherokee and their lands. It is now part of the Cherokee Heritage Trail project.

See also
Cherokee National Forest

References

Trails
Hiking trails